W.F.O. (Wide Fucking Open) is the seventh full-length studio album by thrash metal band Overkill, released on July 15, 1994, on Atlantic Records. 

The album contains "hidden songs" on track 98 the songs start at 10:00, featuring the band warming up in the studio, playing "Heaven and Hell" by Black Sabbath, "The Ripper" by Judas Priest and "Voodoo Child (Slight Return)" by Jimi Hendrix. The instrumental song "R.I.P. (Undone)" was written as a tribute to Criss Oliva, co-founder of the band Savatage, who died nine months before the release of the album.

W.F.O. is the last Overkill album released by Atlantic Records, who released their previous five albums, and their last album with guitarists Rob Cannavino and Merritt Gant. W.F.O. and I Hear Black were re-released on Wounded Bird Records in 2005.

Production and musical style
W.F.O. was the first album Overkill produced themselves. On the making of the album, frontman Bobby "Blitz" Ellsworth explained to Gavin Report:

While W.F.O. was said to be a return to the band's "good ol' thrashin' ways", it continued the traditional heavy metal sound previously used on I Hear Black, but eschewed most of that album's influences from stoner and doom metal in favor of a groove metal influenced sound.

Reception

AllMusic's Jason Anderson gave the album a positive review, awarding it four stars out of five and stating, "W.F.O. probably represents the formal beginnings of a '90s commercial swoon for the thrash metal band." Anderson then added, "By the time of this 1994 release, the group's popularity might have been waning a little due to rock fashion trends leaning heavily away from thrash or anything that reminded listeners of the '80s. That's not to say that W.F.O. isn't a fine recording. It is probably one of the band's best, and last, thrash juggernauts."

W.F.O. reached number nine on the Billboard Heatseekers chart in 1994, making it Overkill's third-highest chart position (after I Hear Black and Ironbound, which peaked at number three and number four respectively). Unlike many of their previous albums, it did not chart on the Billboard 200.

Track listing
 All songs written by Bobby "Blitz" Ellsworth and D.D. Verni.

Hidden tracks
Tracks 12 – 95 are all silence for 0:03-0:04
96 (blank) –  2:56
97 (blank) – 9:00
98 "Heaven and Hell", "The Ripper" and "Voodoo Child (Slight Return)" in rehearsals – (Starts at 1:00) – 4:55 
99 (blank) – 0:04

Sampling
"The Wait/New High in Lows" samples a quote from the 1993 crime film Carlito's Way.

Personnel
 Bobby "Blitz" Ellsworth – lead vocals
 D.D. Verni – bass, backing vocals
 Merritt Gant – guitars
 Rob Cannavino – guitars, backing vocals, acoustic guitar
 Tim Mallare – drums

Additional personnel
 Produced by Overkill
 Keyboards by Doug Cook
 Engineered by Tom Bender and Doug Cook
 Mastered by Howie Weinberg at Masterdisk, New York City, USA

Charts

References

External links
 Official OVERKILL Site

Overkill (band) albums
1994 albums
Atlantic Records albums